Jay Gruska (born April 23, 1952) is an American songwriter and composer best known for his film and television scoring, and for writing hit songs for a variety of artists. He has composed musical scores for dozens of TV dramas, with over 500 hours of shows played internationally.

Gruska has received three Emmy Award nominations, one Genie Award nomination, and nine ASCAP awards. Some of his best-known scores are for the TV shows Lois & Clark: The New Adventures of Superman, Charmed, and Supernatural.

Career 
Gruska started his career as a singer/songwriter. He was briefly a member of Three Dog Night in 1976, replacing Danny Hutton, until the group disbanded.  He had recording contracts with ABC Records and Warner Bros. Records with the band Maxus, for which he was the lead singer and songwriter. Warner Bros. Records later released his solo album Which One of Us Is Me, which Gruska also produced.

Gruska is also known for co-writing the hit duet "Tell Me I'm Not Dreamin' (Too Good to Be True)" for Jermaine and Michael Jackson; the Gloria Loring/Carl Anderson duet "Friends and Lovers" (also released in a country version under the title "Both To Each Other (Friends and Lovers)," performed by Juice Newton and Eddie Rabbitt); and Amy Grant's "Good for Me".

In November 2014, the 200th episode of Supernatural, titled "Fan Fiction", aired on The CW. Gruska wrote and produced two songs for the episode (co-writing the lyrics with screenwriter Robbie Thompson). Within 24 hours after the episode aired, one of the songs, "The Road So Far", was #3 on the iTunes soundtrack chart and #57 among all songs on iTunes.

Personal life 
Gruska is the father of Barbara and Ethan Gruska, the members of the pop music duo The Belle Brigade.

Awards and nominations

Awards 
2014: ASCAP Film/TV Award - Score, Supernatural
2010: ASCAP Film/TV Award - Score, Supernatural
1998: ASCAP Film/TV Award - Score, Charmed
1993: ASCAP Pop Award - "Good for Me"
1988: ASCAP Country Award - "Friends & Lovers (Both to Each Other)"
1988: ASCAP Pop Award - "Friends & Lovers (Both to Each Other)"
1987: ASCAP Country Award - "Friends & Lovers (Both to Each Other)"
1987: ASCAP Pop Award - "Friends & Lovers (Both to Each Other)"

Nominations 
2000: Emmy Award Nomination - Best Original Score, Falcone
2000: Emmy Award Nomination - Best Main Title Theme Music, Falcone
1996: Golden Reel Nomination - Music, Lois & Clark: The New Adventures of Superman
1995: Golden Reel Nomination - Music, Lois & Clark: The New Adventures of Superman
1994: Golden Reel Nomination - Music, Lois & Clark: The New Adventures of Superman
1994: Emmy Award Nomination - Best Main Title Theme Music, Lois & Clark: The New Adventures of Superman
1989: Genie Award for Best Original Song Nomination - Shadow Dancing

Discography

Solo releases
 Gruska on Gruska (1974)
 Which One of Us Is Me (1984)

With Three Dog Night
 American Pastime (1976)

With Maxus
 Maxus (1981)

Film and television

Songwriting credits

References

External links 
jaygruska.com

1952 births
Living people
American male singer-songwriters
American television composers
American film score composers
Record producers from New York (state)
Singer-songwriters from New York (state)
Three Dog Night members